Chris Schlarb (born July 10, 1977) is an American composer, songwriter, record producer, and guitarist. He is best known as the founder and leader of the Psychic Temple cult.

Career

In 1998, Schlarb co-founded the free improvisation ensemble Create (!).

Schlarb founded the record label Sounds Are Active in 1999. Sounds Are Active released over 50 albums and produced the Sean Carnage rockumentary 40 Bands 80 Minutes! (2006).

Schlarb's first solo album, Twilight and Ghost Stories (2007), was the result of recordings sourced from musicians across the US as well as his own home recordings of instruments, rainfall, and traffic.

National Public Radio named I Heart Lung's Interoceans (2008) one of their Top 5 Jazz Albums of 2008.

In 2009, Schlarb collaborated with Swedish video game developer Nifflas on NightSky. Schlarb composed forty tracks of original music for NightSky which was nominated for the Independent Games Festival’s Seumas McNally Grand Prize. BoingBoing described the score as “what game music can be”.

Psychic Temple
In 2010, Schlarb formed a band in Long Beach, California called Psychic Temple.  The band is called a 'cult' by members, drawing from similarities Schlarb observed between bands and cults.

Psychic Temple has released 5 studio albums: Psychic Temple (2010), Psychic Temple II (2013), Psychic Temple Plays Music For Airports (2016), Psychic Temple III (2016), and Psychic Temple IV (2017).

BIG EGO
In 2016, Schlarb and wife, Adriana, opened BIG EGO Studios, a recording studio located in Long Beach, California.

In 2018, Schlarb founded BIG EGO Records, a record label that handles all physical distribution with a bi-annual shipment of select vinyl albums to BIG EGO annual series subscribers.

Schlarb has collaborated with Mike Watt (Minutemen), Sufjan Stevens, Nels Cline (Wilco), Paul Masvidal (Cynic), Mick Rossi (Philip Glass Ensemble), Dave Longstreth (The Dirty Projectors), Julianna Barwick, Dave Easley (Brian Blade Fellowship), Ikey Owens (The Mars Volta), Daedelus, Chad Taylor, Serengeti, Omid Walizadeh, Busdriver, Awol One, Diane Cluck, Steuart Liebig, Walter Kitundu, Soul-Junk, Chad Van Gaalen, Liz Janes, Maria Elena Silva, Philip Glenn, DM Stith, and Talip Peshkepia.

Discography
Studio Albums

As Composer
 Twilight and Ghost Stories (2007) (Asthmatic Kitty) 
 Psychic Temple (2010) (Asthmatic Kitty)
 NightSky (2011) (Asthmatic Kitty)
 Psychic Temple II (2013) (Asthmatic Kitty)
 Making The Saint (2014) (Asthmatic Kitty)
 Dropsy (2015) (Joyful Noise Recordings)
 Psychic Temple Plays Music For Airports (2016) (Joyful Noise Recordings)
 Psychic Temple III (2016) (Asthmatic Kitty)
 Psychic Temple IV (2017) (Joyful Noise Recordings)

With I Heart Lung
 Interoceans (2008) (Asthmatic Kitty)
 Between Them A Forest Grew, Trackless and Quiet (2007) (Sounds Are Active)

With  Create (!)
 A Prospect of Freedom (2006) (Sounds Are Active)
 Liz Janes & Create (!) (2005) (Asthmatic Kitty)

Filmography
Film

References

External links
BIG EGO - Official Website
Chris Schlarb Bandcamp
Asthmatic Kitty Artist Page
Joyful Noise Recordings Artist Page
Instagram

Living people
People from Long Beach, California
1977 births
Asthmatic Kitty artists
American jazz musicians
21st-century religious leaders
American bandleaders
Songwriters from California
American jazz composers
Jazz musicians from California